Lebetus is a genus of gobies native to the eastern Atlantic Ocean.

Species
There are currently two recognized species in this genus:
 Lebetus guilleti (É. Le Danois, 1913) (Guillet's goby)
 Lebetus scorpioides (Collett, 1874) (Diminutive goby)

References

Gobiidae
Marine fish genera